Freeman "Duke" Asmundson (born August 17, 1943) is a Canadian retired professional ice hockey player who played 258 games in the World Hockey Association. Born in Vita, Manitoba, he played for the Winnipeg Jets.

Career statistics

Awards and achievements
MJHL Second All-Star Team (1964)
WHA Championship (1976)

References

1943 births
Living people
Canadian ice hockey right wingers
Canadian people of Icelandic descent
Dayton Gems players
Des Moines Oak Leafs players
Ice hockey people from Manitoba
People from Eastman Region, Manitoba
Winnipeg Monarchs players
Rochester Americans players
St. Louis Braves players
Springfield Indians players
Toledo Blades players
Tulsa Oilers (1964–1984) players
Winnipeg Jets (WHA) players
Canadian expatriate ice hockey players in the United States
20th-century Canadian people